Jefferson Township is one of nine townships in Pike County, Indiana, United States. As of the 2010 census, its population was 1,814 and it contained 825 housing units.

Geography
The White River defines the township's north border, as well as the north border of Pike County.

Unincorporated towns
 Algiers at 
 Cato at 
 Highbank Town at 
 Iva at 
 Otwell at 
(This list is based on USGS data and may include former settlements.)

Cemeteries
The township contains these eight cemeteries: Arnold, Bluff, Case, Chapel, Independent Order of Odd Fellows, Logan, McClure and Willis.

Major highways

School districts
 Pike County School Corporation
 Otwell Miller Academy, Public Charter School. Grades K-5

Political districts
 State House District 63
 State Senate District 48

References
 
 United States Census Bureau 2009 TIGER/Line Shapefiles
 IndianaMap

External links
 Indiana Township Association
 United Township Association of Indiana
 City-Data.com page for Jefferson Township

Townships in Pike County, Indiana
Jasper, Indiana micropolitan area
Townships in Indiana